HD 126128/9 is a triple star in the northern constellation of Boötes. Two of the components (HD 126128) form a binary star system with an orbital period of 39.5 years and an eccentricity of 0.25. The third component (HD 126129), and the brightest member of the trio, lies at an angular separation of 6.250″ from the other two.

References

External links
 HR 5385
 CCDM J14234+082
 Image HD 126128

Boötes
126128
Triple star systems
F-type main-sequence stars
070327
5385 6
Durchmusterung objects